Chris Totten (born 5 December 1998 in Wishaw, Lanarkshire) is a Scottish former professional snooker player. He is a former EBSA European Snooker Champion.

Career
In March 2017, Totten entered the 2017 EBSA European Snooker Championship as the number 28 seed, he managed to advance to the final where he defeated Andres Petrov 7–3 in the final to win the championship. As a result, Totten was given a two-year card on the professional World Snooker Tour for the 2017–18 and 2018–19 seasons.

Performance and rankings timeline

Career finals

Amateur finals: 3 (3 titles)

References

External links

Chris Totten at worldsnooker.com
Chris Totten at CueTracker.net: Snooker Results and Statistic Database

Scottish snooker players
Living people
1998 births
Sportspeople from Wishaw